Puerto Busch is a Bolivian locality in the province of Germán Busch, Santa Cruz Department, on the Paraguay River, in southeastern Bolivia. It is named in honor of General Germán Busch, who fought in the Chaco War.

The area, actually a corridor by the name of Dionisio Foianini Triangle, was awarded to Bolivia in the treaty that ended the Chaco War. The greater area is mostly marshland subject to flooding and is sparsely populated by natives of the Chiquitano and Ayoreo tribe.

As of late 2004 Puerto Busch is unpopulated except for some Bolivian Naval guards. An 85-mile (140 km) road, corridor Man Céspedes, connects Puerto Busch with Puerto Suárez. A railroad spur from Puerto Suárez is planned for Puerto Busch. A major port is under construction in Puerto Busch which will finally give Bolivia a water route to the Atlantic Ocean via the Paraguay River. It is located along the Paraguay River and is Bolivia's only direct exit to the ocean.

It is also home to Bolivian Navy flotilla - 5th Naval District / 2nd Naval Service Area / 5th Marine Battalion Calama.

Populated places in Santa Cruz Department (Bolivia)